Oberrieden railway station is a railway station in Switzerland, situated on the banks of Lake Zurich in the town of Oberrieden. The station is located on the Lake Zurich left bank railway line and is served by line S8 of the Zurich S-Bahn.

The station has two side platforms, serving the two tracks passing through the station. The principal station building is to the west of the railway, whilst on the opposite side of the tracks is the goods shed, dating from 1874 and a class B regional property in the Swiss Inventory of Cultural Property of National and Regional Significance.

Oberrieden station should not be confused with the nearby, but higher level, Oberrieden Dorf railway station, which is on the Thalwil–Arth-Goldau railway.

References

External links 
 
 

Cultural property of regional significance in the canton of Zürich
Railway stations in the canton of Zürich
Swiss Federal Railways stations